Hania is a 2019 Pakistani thriller drama television series, produced by Humayun Saeed and Shahzad Nasib under their banner Six Sigma Plus. It features Junaid Khan as Junaid, Osama Tahir as Rohaan and Zoya Nasir as Hania in lead.

The series was earlier titled Adhoori Kahani, but the makers changed it to Hania. It was first aired on thursday nights then in ramadan it shifted to friday nights after ramadan finally it shifted to Saturday nights at 9:00 pm  It revolves around mysterious events happening in Junaid Shah's house. It also focuses on domestic violence against women through focusing on Hania's husband. It is based on real-life situations that how the girls like Hania are victimized by the people around her.

Cast
Junaid Khan as Junaid Shah (Dead)
Zoya Nasir as Hania Junaid/Rohan
Ghana Ali as Maira; Younger sister of Hania
Osama Tahir as Rohan
Atiqa Odho as Saira; Rohan's mother
Nayyar Ejaz as Vohra Sahab; Junaid's illegal business partner
Mariam Mirza as Junaid's mother
Waseem Abbas as Ahsan; Hania and Maira's father
Ismat Iqbal as Jameela; Hania's mother
Firdous Jamal as Fareed; Rohan's father
Hassan Ahmed as Kazim; A police officer and a close friend of Hania's father

References

2019 Pakistani television series debuts
Urdu-language television shows
Pakistani drama television series
ARY Digital original programming